The Niel Jaarmarkt Cyclo-cross is a cyclo-cross race held in Niel, Belgium. 

Until 2008 the race was part of the Cyclo-cross Gazet van Antwerpen. From 2009 to 2017 it was part of the Soudal Classics. From 2018-2019 it was part of the DVV Trophy. In 2020 it moved to the Superprestige series.

Past winners

Men

Women

References
 Results

Cyclo-cross races
Cycle races in Belgium
Recurring sporting events established in 1963
1963 establishments in Belgium
Sport in Antwerp Province